Manuel Ricciardi (born 17 April 2000) is an Italian professional footballer who plays as a right back for  club Avellino.

Club career
Born in Rome, Ricciardi was formed in Ascoli Calcio youth system.

On 31 July 2019, he was loaned to Serie C club Fano, and made his professional debut on 20 October 2019 against Carpi.

For the next season, on 10 September 2020 the defender was loaned to Legnago Salus. The loan was extended the next year.

On 12 July 2022 he joined Avellino on permanent basis.

References

External links
 
 

2000 births
Living people
Footballers from Rome
Italian footballers
Association football defenders
Ascoli Calcio 1898 F.C. players
Alma Juventus Fano 1906 players
F.C. Legnago Salus players
U.S. Avellino 1912 players
Serie C players